Actis is a global investment firm focused on the private equity, energy, infrastructure, and real estate asset classes. 

Actis is a signatory to the United Nations Principles for Responsible Investment (UNPRI), an investor initiative developed by the UNEP FI and the UN Global Compact. Actis targets consistent superior returns across asset classes over the long-term, bringing financial and social benefits to investors, consumers and communities. It is focused on investments in emerging markets in Africa, China, India, Latin America, and South East Asia.

Actis was formed in July 2004, as a spinout of CDC Group plc (formerly the Commonwealth Development Corporation), an organization established by the UK Government in 1948 to invest in developing economies in Africa, Asia, and the Caribbean. The Actis management team acquired majority ownership of CDC's emerging markets investment platform.

History
Actis was founded in 2004 as a spinout from CDC Group, the UK's development finance institution, when a 60% stake in the firm was sold to CDC managers and staff for a total consideration of £373,000. The new company was given a five-year 'umbrella' guarantee that it would continue to manage all CDC's existing overseas investments totalling US$900 million in CDC funds. According to the UK's Department for International Development, the price was agreed after a valuation by financial advisers KPMG. Under the 2004 deal that created Actis, if the company was to be sold on the open market within 10 years, 80% of the profits and proceeds would go back to the government.

In 2007, UK prime minister Gordon Brown came under attack over the sell-off of Actis after it became apparent that the formerly government-owned business had made millions of pounds for its former employees.

On 1 May 2012 the Secretary of State for International Development, Andrew Mitchell, announced that the state's remaining 40% stake had been sold to Actis management for an initial £8m. The deal also included a share of future profits that could be worth over £62m to the UK Government.

In August 2013, Actis acquired the South African firm Transaction Capital's payment services unit, Paycorp, for US$95 million.

In October 2013, the firm announced it had invested US$48 million in the Indian pharmaceuticals company Symbiotec Pharmalab for a "significant stake".

In July 2017, Actis announced investing $275 million in the education sector in Africa. The investment is made through the creation of Honoris United Universities, a network of institutions, including Mancosa and Regent Business School in South Africa.

In March 2019, Actis was named "Impact Investment Firm of the Year" at the 2018 Private Equity International Awards. The firm also placed second in the Energy Private Equity category, behind I Squared Capital.

In April 2019, driven by an industry-wide trend towards more transparency in impact investing, the firm launched the "Actis Impact Score", an open-source framework that seeks to consistently measure impact from investment to investment, thus permitting comparison across different asset classes or geographies, as well as tracking its evolution over the holding period.

In mid 2018, following the crisis and subsequent collapse of The Abraaj Group, Actis moved to acquire and assume management of Abraaj's Middle East and North Africa funds. While other players were interested and placed competing bids, including higher offers from firms based in the Persian Gulf, Actis was ultimately preferred by investors to take over the funds due to its emerging-markets expertise and operations-focused investment rationale, as well as in interest of a block deal that encompassed all underlying assets.

In July 2019, after a complex, multiyear process, it was announced that Actis had secured management rights to Abraaj Private Equity Fund IV and Abraaj Africa Fund III, totaling $2.99 billion of assets under management and 14 portfolio companies. The transaction also included around 25 junior employees formerly employed by Abraaj. Commenting on the deal, Actis' Chief Investment Officer stated it was a response after "a number of investors asked us to step in to be part of a solution in mid-2018". With the transaction, Actis reaches $12 billion under management and 250 employees globally.

In August 2019, the firm reached final close for the Actis Long Life Infrastructure Fund (ALLIF), raising $1.23 billion in committed capital - below its original $2.0 billion target, later reduced to $1.5 billion to accommodate increased co-investment appetite from LPs. The 15-year, brownfield- and yield-focused, core infrastructure vehicle represents a strategic shift for Actis, which has historically targeted buy-and-build investments via its flagship energy funds. Despite this shift, the first two deployments for ALLIF were within renewable energy generation - a 110MW PV solar plant in Chile acquired from SunPower in 2018, and a 137MW wind farm in Brazil sold by EDP Renováveis in 2019 for R$ 598 million.

In September 2019, Actis sold Atlantic Energias Renováveis and its operating 642MW wind power portfolio to China General Nuclear (CGN) for a reported figure of c. R$ 4 billion, or roughly six-to-seven times of its initial investment in local currency. Actis benefited from being one of the early movers into renewable energy generation in Brazil, reaching the status of joint-largest wind operator in the country with platform companies Atlantic and Echoenergia.

In August 2022, Actis acquired controlling stake in Yellow Door Energy, a Dubai-based solar provider company.

References

External links
Actis (company website)

Private equity firms of the United Kingdom
Financial services companies based in London
Financial services companies established in 2004
2004 establishments in England